Jonquières is the name or part of the name of several communes in France:

 Jonquières, Aude, in the Aude département
 Jonquières, Hérault, in the Hérault département
 Jonquières, Oise, in the Oise département
 Jonquières, Tarn, in the Tarn département
 Jonquières, Vaucluse, in the Vaucluse département
 Jonquières-Saint-Vincent, in the Gard département
 Saint-Pierre-des-Jonquières, in the Seine-Maritime département

See also
 Jonquières, Bouches-du-Rhône is a former commune of the Bouches-du-Rhône département, now part of Martigues